Nob Hill Motel, formerly the Modern Auto Court, at 3712 Central Ave. SE. (the original U.S. Route 66) in Albuquerque, New Mexico, was built in 1937.  It was listed on the New Mexico State Register of Cultural Properties and the National Register of Historic Places in 1993. The listing included four contributing buildings.

Its architecture is Southwest Vernacular.  It is one of few pre-World War II tourist courts remaining along Route 66 in New Mexico.  It consists of four one-story buildings.

See also

References

Motels in the United States
National Register of Historic Places in Albuquerque, New Mexico
Buildings and structures completed in 1937
Hotels in Albuquerque, New Mexico
Hotel buildings on the National Register of Historic Places in New Mexico
New Mexico State Register of Cultural Properties